"Sail Away" is a song written by Rafe Van Hoy, and first recorded by American country music artist Sam Neely.  Neely's version was released in September 1977.  The single peaked at number 98 on Hot Country Songs and 84 on the Billboard Hot 100.  Kenny Rogers covered the song on his Love or Something Like It album.

It was later covered by American country music group The Oak Ridge Boys.  It was released in April 1979 as the first single from their album The Oak Ridge Boys Have Arrived.  The song spent thirteen weeks on the Hot Country Songs charts and peaked at number two. In Canada, the song spent three weeks at the number one position on the RPM Country Tracks chart, reaching that position on the June 2, 1979 chart.

Charts

Weekly charts

Year-end charts

References

Songs about boats
Songs about oceans and seas
1977 singles
1979 singles
1977 songs
Sam Neely songs
Kenny Rogers songs
The Oak Ridge Boys songs
Elektra Records singles
MCA Records singles
Song recordings produced by Ron Chancey
Songs written by Rafe Van Hoy